Horror films released in the 1970s are listed in the following articles:
 List of horror films of 1970
 List of horror films of 1971
 List of horror films of 1972
 List of horror films of 1973
 List of horror films of 1974
 List of horror films of 1975
 List of horror films of 1976
 List of horror films of 1977
 List of horror films of 1978
 List of horror films of 1979

1970s
horror